Keith Dyson (born 10 February 1950) is an English former professional footballer. He played as a forward.

Dyson began his career with Newcastle United in 1968. In three years at St James' Park, he made 76 league appearances and scored 22 goals.

In October 1971, he joined Blackpool in a deal that took Tony Green to Tyneside for a then-club record fee. Dyson went on to score thirty goals in 94 appearances during his five-year Bloomfield Road career. He was advised to retire from the professional game as a result of a knee injury.

His final club was Lancaster City, though after playing his testimonial game, he went to America on holiday in the summer of 1978 and met up with friend Jackie Mudie. The former Blackpool great was coaching the Cleveland Cobras and convinced Dyson to play for the second half of the season with remarkable results.

He returned to the UK and managed Lancaster City between 1979 and 1982.

Notes

References

1950 births
Living people
Sportspeople from Consett
Footballers from County Durham
English footballers
England under-23 international footballers
Newcastle United F.C. players
Blackpool F.C. players
Lancaster City F.C. players
American Soccer League (1933–1983) players
Cleveland Cobras players
Lancaster City F.C. managers
Association football forwards
English expatriate sportspeople in the United States
Expatriate soccer players in the United States
English expatriate footballers
English football managers